Jewelry Television is an American television network specializing in the sale of jewelry for both men and women. On-air and online, the network is mainly branded by its jtv initials in lower-case letters. It has an estimated reach of more than 80 million U.S. households, through cable and satellite providers, online streaming and limited over-the-air broadcasters.

The headquarters of Jewelry Television are located in Knoxville, Tennessee. It has manufacturing facilities in Sri Lanka, Hong Kong, and Thailand.

History
Jewelry Television was founded as America's Collectibles Network (ACN) in 1993 by Jerry Sisk Jr., Bob Hall, and Bill Kouns. Sisk was a graduate  gemologist, Kouns was a jewelry expert, and Hall had previously worked in the television industry.

The fledgling network began broadcasting from a studio in Greeneville, Tennessee, with just one television camera. ACN initially sold gemstones, jewelry, and collectible coins. Sisk, Hall, and Kouns later moved the network to a larger headquarters and television studio in Knoxville.

In 2002, the company re-launched as Jewelry Television and has since focused on selling gemstones, jewelry and jewelry-making kits.

In 2006, Jewelry Television bought competitor Shop at Home and its assets from Scripps.

On June 21, 2006, Jewelry Television replaced Shop at Home on Shop at Home-affiliated stations owned by Scripps.

In 2008 and 2009, Jewelry Television experienced multiple rounds of layoffs, due to the "great recession" and increasing prices of gold and silver.

Jewelry Television has approximately 1,400 employees, as of May 2019.

Canadian expansion
On September 7, 2022, Jewelry Television announced that the network would officially pursue further Canadian pay-TV carriage and facilitate easier shipping into the country from the United States, after years of streaming grey market coverage.

Overview
Jewelry Television airs 24 hours a day, although programming hours vary between each region, based on the local TV provider. In October 2008 the network began broadcasting in high definition. The network also streams online through its website, like most home shopping networks.

In April 2012, Jewelry Television launched the Titanic Jewelry Collection. Created in partnership with Titanic Museum Attractions, this proprietary collection offers pieces in the Art Nouveau and Edwardian styles typical of that era.

Lawsuits
On March 26, 2008, Jewelry Television filed suit in the U.S. District Court in Tennessee against Lloyd's of London, as a result of a criminal scheme that took place in 2006 and 2007. A person had used a bank account of the Office of the Comptroller of the City of New York to buy more than $3.5 million in jewelry.

On May 23, 2008, a $5 million class action lawsuit was filed in California against Jewelry Television. The suit alleged that since 2003, the shopping network has sold a gemstone called andesine-labradorite, without disclosing its treatment, while promising buyers that this stone was rare and untreated. On June 2, 2008, Jewelry Television said andesine-labradorite has been sold in the gem trade since 2002 as a natural and untreated material. "Lab reports from major laboratories have consistently confirmed these gemstones as natural and untreated. Jewelry Television, like other major retailers, relied upon the lab reports and general industry information".

On May 19, 2009, an age discrimination lawsuit was filed against Jewelry Television alleging an employee had been terminated as part of a company-wide reduction in workforce the previous May.

Affiliates

Alabama
 Montgomery – WALE-LD 17.4

Arizona
 Phoenix – KPHE-LD 44.4
 Phoenix – KDPH-LD 58.1

Arkansas
 Hot Springs – KTVV-LD 18.8
 Little Rock – KLRA-CD 20.3
 Winslow – KBPI-CD 31.4
 Fort Smith – KFDF-CD 44.4

California
 Los Angeles – KZNO-LD 12.1
 Los Angeles – KSFV-CD 27.1
 San Jose – KAAP-LD 24.8
 Sacramento – KSTV-LD 32.2
 Rohnert Park - KZHD-LD 15.1
 Esparto – K04QR-D 38.1
 Fresno – KVHF-LD 4.5
 Monterey – K14SI-LD 43.3
 Santa Barbara – KBAB-LD 31.2
 San Francisco - KPJC-LD 22.4
 Santa Maria – KWSM-LD 32.4
 Bishop – KVME-TV 20.1
 Palm Springs – KOGD-LD 17.5

Colorado
 Denver – KZDN-LD 26.4
 Sterling – KCDO-TV 10.3
 Akron - K11UW-D 10.3
 Yuma - K34AC-D 10.3

Florida
 Orlando – WSWF-LD 10.6
 Ocala – WRCZ-LD 35.7

Idaho
 Boise – KKIC-LD 16.6
 Boise – KCBB-LD 41.3

Illinois
 Chicago – WRME-LD 6.1
 Chicago – WCHU-LD 16.6
 Sugar Grove – WILC-CD 6.1

Indiana
 Hammond – WJYS 62.7
 Indianapolis - WSDI-LD 30.7

Iowa
 Cedar Rapids – KPXR-TV 48.6 (Soon)

Kansas
 Topeka – WROB-LD 25.12
 Kansas City – KCKS-LD 25.12

Kentucky
 Louisville – WMYO-CD 24.7

Louisiana
 Louisiana - KWWE-LD 19.5

Michigan
 Detroit – WHNE-LP 3.8
 Detroit – WHPS-CD 15.4

Minnesota
 Twin Cities - KWJM-LD 15.4

Missouri
 St. Louis – KPTN-LD 7.7

Nevada
 Las Vegas – KLSV-LD 50.3

New Jersey
 Teaneck – WNYK-LD 27.1
 Roseland – WMNF-LD 17.2
 Atlantic City – WACP 4.5
 Glassboro – WQAV-CD 34.1
 Princeton – WMCN-TV 44.4

New Mexico
 Albuquerque – KTRN-LP 39.3

New York
 Buffalo – WBXZ-LD 56.3
 Newburgh – WEPT-CD 15.1
 New York – WNYJ-LD 28.1 
 Port Jervis - WASA-LD 24.3
 Syracuse – WHSU-CD 51.4

North Carolina
 Lumberton-Pembroke – WTNG-CD 7.11

Ohio
 Cleveland – WUEK-LD 26.6
 Cincinnati – WBQC-LD 25.4
 Sandusky – WGGN-TV 6.7

Oklahoma
 Tulsa – KUOC-LD 48.6

Pennsylvania
 Pittsburgh – WBYD-CD 39.1
 Hazleton - WYLN-CD 35.1 (12AM-8AM)

Puerto Rico
 Añasco – W34FK-D 33.4

Tennessee
 Alexandria – WRTN-LD 6.7

Texas
 Baytown – KUBE-TV 57.8
 Dallas – KJJM-LD 34.4
 Houston – KVQT-LD 21.9
 Laredo – KLMV-LD 15.4
 Lubbock – KYML-LD 14.5
 San Antonio – KISA-LD 40.8
 Tyler – KPKN-LP 33.7

Utah
 Salt Lake City – KPDR-LD 19.4

Washington
 Bellingham – KBCB 24.4
 Yakima – KYPK-LD 32.5

Wisconsin
 Milwaukee – WTSJ-LD 38.3

References

External links 
 
 Jewelry TV at Rabbitears.info

Shopping networks in the United States
Television channels and stations established in 1993
1993 establishments in Tennessee
Companies based in Knoxville, Tennessee
Television broadcasting companies of the United States
Television networks in the United States